The Tamil Nadu Premier League (TNPL) is a professional Twenty20 cricket league contested in the state of Tamil Nadu in India and was formed in 2016 by the Tamil Nadu Cricket Association (TNCA). It is played during July and August of every year by eight teams representing eight districts in Tamil Nadu. Shriram Group is the current sponsor of the tournament.  The first season was inaugurated by former Indian cricket team captain MS Dhoni.  Then it was won by Tuti Patriots.

There have been five seasons of TNPL. The current champions, Chepauk Super Gillies are also the most successful team after winning the title in 2017, 2019 and 2021. The other teams which have won the title are Salem Spartans (Tuti Patriots) in 2016 and Siechem Madurai Panthers in 2018.

In 2019 two of the franchises were accused of match fixing which led to removal of co-owners of a franchise. However both franchises remained intact in the league.

It is one of the regional cricket premier leagues of India.

History

Background 
In 2016, the TNPL was launched at the time when Chennai Super Kings, the Tamil Nadu franchise playing Indian Premier League (IPL), was facing a two-year suspension from the league. The league was aimed to make up for the absence of high-profile matches in Chennai in the year and to expose talented players from districts. It was launched by then TNCA president N. Srinivasan, who is also the owner of Chennai Super Kings and TNPL's initial title sponsor, India Cements.

Franchise rights 

On 1 May 2016, TNCA invited bidders for the eight franchise rights. A total of 17 bidders participated in the bidding process. Members of TNCA were not allowed to participate. The second highest was Metronation Chennai Television Pvt. Ltd which bought the Chennai team . And Salem Spartans is the costliest team in TNPL  with

Inauguration 
On 16 August 2016, the first edition was inaugurated by MS Dhoni in Chennai. The first edition featured popular players like Ravichandran Ashwin, Murali Vijay, Dinesh Karthik and Lakshmipathy Balaji. It also featured players registered with the state association. Robin Singh and Michael Bevan were appointed as coaches. Matthew Hayden was the brand ambassador of the league. BookMyShow.com sold the match tickets from  while Star Sports were the TV broadcasters.

Outstation players registered with the TNCA like Piyush Chawla and Hardik Pandya were expected to join the season. However, they did not since TNCA was not given permission at the time by the BCCI.

The season was played from 24 August to 18 September. Tuti Patriots emerged as the champions in the final against Chepauk Super Gillies held in M. A. Chidambaram Stadium, Chennai.

Organisation

Tournament format 
The eight teams play against each other in the league phase in round-robin format. Teams will get two points for each win. At the end of the league stage, top four teams in the points table will qualify for the playoffs. Much like the IPL, the playoffs consist of three matches before the final: one eliminator and two qualifiers. The top two teams from the league phase will play against each other in the Qualifier 1, with the winner going straight to the final and the loser getting another chance to qualify for the final by playing the Qualifier 2. Meanwhile, the third and fourth place teams from league phase play against each other in an eliminator match and the winner from that match will advance to play the Qualifier 2. The winner of this match will head to final to meet the winner of Qualifier 1, where the winner will be crowned champions.

Player acquisition and salaries 

Players draft takes place months before the tournament. Teams can acquire a maximum and minimum players of 22 and 16 respectively. They are allowed to retain three players each from last season. Players at the draft are split in four categories on the basis of their experience.

Until 2020, BCCI prevented TNCA from allowing outstation players to participate in the league. A maximum of 2 outstation players can be in a team given that they are not currently in any IPL team. A separate draft for outstation players is scheduled to happen after 2020 IPL season for TNPL season 5.

Sponsorship and revenues 
The title sponsor from the inception was India Cements Limited whose term ended in 2019. This was the highest among all the local T20 leagues in India. The business model followed by TNPL is similar to the IPL's model. For the first five years, central rights (broadcast fees and sponsorship fees) will be shared 80 per cent among the eight franchises with the rest going to the administrator TNCA. This excludes the match staging costs. As much as 65 per cent will be divided equally between the franchises with the rest 15 per cent given to the franchises as per their standing in the league. Gate collections are not shared with the franchises. To attract sponsors, owners were advised to name their teams after districts in the state.

In 2019, some of the franchises faced financial difficulties and asked TNCA to bring changes to the revenue sharing model of the league.

Prize money 
The prize money split between the teams are:

 Champions – 
 Runner up – 
 Two semi-finalists –   each
 Remaining participants –

Teams
There are eight franchises competing in league. The franchises are named after a district it is representing in the state. Each team can have a maximum of 22 players that includes two outstation players. In 2021, One of the franchise changed their name and base – VB Kanchi Veerans of Kancheepuram shifted to Tirunelveli featuring as Nellai Royal Kings .

Defunct teams

Venues
A total of three venues were used until 2019. Grounds in Dindigul and Tirunelveli hosts every match in the league stages between them. The M. A. Chidambaram Stadium in Chennai is generally used for only two matches in the playoff stages including the final.

Two new venues in Salem and Coimbatore  are slated to host matches from 2020 onwards. The ground in Coimbatore was expected to host matches in the fourth season itself. But TNCA wanted age-group tournaments held there first before TNPL. The Chennai venue will not host matches in the upcoming season.

Tournament results

Teams' performances

Records

Highest totals

Highest individual scores

Title sponsorship 
From 2016 to 2019, India Cements Limited (Sankar Cement) owned the title rights of the league. A tender for new title rights sponsor was released in March 2020 by TNCA.

Broadcasting 
Disney Star broadcasts the matches on Star Sports 1 HD with English Commentary and in Star Sports 1 Tamil HD with Tamil Commentary. Star also broadcast via their OTT platform, Disney+ Hotstar.

Criticisms and controversies

Franchises facing financial difficulties 
On 26 May 2019, several franchise owners under financial distress wrote to TNCA asking for changes made in the upcoming season. The leaked letter signed by teams Tuti Patriots, Lyca Kovai Kings, Siechem Madurai Panthers, Ruby Trichy Warriors and iDream Karaikudi Kaalai was confidential in nature. The franchise owners and TNCA were both upset about the leak of the letter which had caused negative image towards the league.

The main concerns in the letter were regarding the lack of outstation players' participation, quality of umpiring, unavailability of Tamil Nadu players who represent India and matches being held in relatively smaller venues. The franchises were also concerned over the viewership for the league and the television rating points. The league was criticised for not sharing the gate collections with the franchises, following IPL model. They suggested several changes for TNPL. They asked TNCA to allow outstation players and to ask Tamil Nadu players who represent India to take part in the league. They also demanded a better revenue sharing method to prevent losses of the franchises.

On 4 June 2019 in a meeting with the owners, TNCA's reacted to the issue saying that it shares 80 per cent of the telecast and sponsorship fees with the franchises and the association gains only a net  from TNPL after meeting all expenses. Some owners were unsatisfied with the response and demanded a forensic audit of TNPL's accounts.

Match-fixing allegations 
In 2019, Tuti Patriots and Madurai Panthers faced match fixing allegations. BCCI president Sourav Ganguly had said that these franchises were suspended due to connection with bookies but TNCA said that they were not. However, TNCA has asked franchise Tuti Patriots to remove two of their co-owners in link to the corruption. In 2020, Tuti Patriots were renamed as Salem Spartans for the next season due to the change in ownership.

See also 
 List of regional T20 cricket leagues in India
 Celebrity Cricket League

References

External links 

 
Cricket leagues in India
Indian domestic cricket competitions
Cricket in Tamil Nadu
Professional sports leagues in India
Twenty20 cricket leagues
2016 establishments in Tamil Nadu
Sports leagues established in 2016